Gujjar is a village and union council of Jhelum District in the Punjab Province of Pakistan. It is part of Pind Dadan Khan Tehsil. It gets its name from the Gujjar tribe, who make up the majority of its population.

References

Populated places in Tehsil Pind Dadan Khan
Union councils of Pind Dadan Khan Tehsil